Life 6 Sense (stylized as LIFE 6 SENSE) is the 6th album released on 1 June 2011. This album has a total of 12 tracks. The album was highly anticipated, as Uverworld themselves think highly of the album as they originally had 6 members including Seika, now Seika is their manipulator. This album was ranked #1 at the Ninki Chart and was charted at #2 for Oricon Weekly Ranking, charted for 16 weeks selling a total of 95,235 copies in its first week. The album also hit No.12 in Gano International Music Chart. The first track of the album, "Core Pride" has been featured in the "Blue Exorcist" anime television series as the first opening.

Track listing

References 

2011 albums
Uverworld albums
Gr8! Records albums
Japanese-language albums